Polypoetes haruspex is a moth of the family Notodontidae first described by Herbert Druce in 1885. It is found in Panama and Costa Rica.

A calling female has been observed, perched under a leaf at the tip of a branch approximately four meters above the ground, with dozens of males fluttering around it. This is the first verified observation of calling behavior in the Dioptinae.

The larvae feed on Celtis iguanaea.

References

Moths described in 1885
Notodontidae